Keysborough is a suburb in Melbourne, Victoria, Australia, 27 km south-east of Melbourne's Central Business District, located within the City of Greater Dandenong local government area.

Keysborough was named after the Keys family who founded the town sometime after 1878.

Keysborough is one of the largest suburbs in Melbourne by land area. Geographically, it is split into three sections, the southern portion of the suburb includes market gardens and semi-rural properties extending to its southern boundaries Pillars Road and the Mordialloc Creek, the middle portion of the suburb features large residential and industrial development which began in the 2000s, and the northern section of the suburb to its northern boundaries with Noble Park and Springvale South generally features housing predominantly built from the 1960s extending well into the 1990s. The suburb's western boundary is Springvale Road and eastern boundary is Dandenong Creek/EastLink.

The Post Office opened on 27 November 1973 and was known as Noble Park South until 1978.
 
Today, Keysborough facilitates several primary and secondary schools, including the Keysborough campus of Haileybury College and Lighthouse Christian College. Parkmore Shopping Centre includes a Coles, Woolworths, Kmart, Big W, Australia Post and an assortment of specialty stores. As of 2002 the southern corner of the suburb was under development and new housing estates have been developed including The Keys, Hidden Grove, and Crystal Waters. In 2017, Elmswood and Somerfield are new housing estates in southern Keysborough currently under development.

Population

In the 2016 Census, there were 25,785 people in Keysborough. 43.5% of people were born in Australia. The next most common countries of birth were Vietnam 9.1%, Cambodia 7.3%, India 6.1%, China 4.4% and Sri Lanka 3.9%.  37.4% of people spoke only English at home. Other languages spoken at home included Vietnamese 12.1%, Khmer 8.4%, Mandarin 5.9%, Cantonese 4.1% and Turkish 2.5%. The most common responses for religion were Catholic 24.8%, No Religion, so described 20.5% and Buddhism 18.8%.

Of occupied private dwellings in Keysborough, 89.6% were separate houses, 8.0% were semi-detached, row or terrace house and 2.2% were flats or apartments. 79% of homes in the suburb are owned or being purchased by their occupants.

Education

Keysborough is home to several schools and educational facilities. The Chandler Park (which are Chandler primary school and Maralinga Primary school merged) name was made from combining Chandler and Maralinga Park. Keysborough Park and Maralinga primary schools and Keysborough Secondary College - Acacia Campus are located within the suburb's boundaries, while Wallarano Primary School and Keysborough Secondary College - Banksia Campus are just beyond its northern boundary and have catchment areas which include parts of Keysborough. The Resurrection Catholic Primary School is also located in Keysborough on Corrigan Road.

On Springvale Road, the suburb's western boundary, is the Keysborough campus of Haileybury College, which is co-educational and includes Newlands, a preparatory school. The Assemblies of God-run Lighthouse Christian College. The Keysborough campus of the Turkish-run independent community school Sirius College, and Mount Hira College, are other private schools in the area.

On the southern end of the suburb's boundary, a new government school, Keysborough Gardens Primary School, commenced operation in 2020.

Transport

Keysborough is serviced by buses operated by Grenda's Bus Services and Moorabbin Transit. These buses can be hailed from Parkmore Shopping Centre, while the SmartBus has to be hailed from Springvale Road.

Leisure

There are several parks and shopping centres in the vicinity of Keysborough. The major shopping centre located in Keysborough is Parkmore Shopping Centre, which is operated by GPT (General Property Trust). Approximately six buses run through this shopping centre.

Keysborough also has various sporting clubs which cater for different levels of proficiency;
Tennis - The Keysborough Tennis Court offers eight porous courts for members,
Football - Keysborough Junior Football Club and Parkmore Football club offer Australian Rules Football. The town has a few Australian Rules football teams competing in the Mornington Peninsula Nepean Football League. It is also the location of Gaelic Park, home of the Victoria GAA for Hurling and Gaelic Football and this is the only facility owned by an association outside Ireland.
Football (soccer) - Keysborough Soccer Club based at Coomoora Reserve competes in Football Federation Victoria Provisional League Division 2 South-East and Parkmore Soccer Club, near the new Hidden Grove estate, competes in Football Federation Victoria Metropolitan League Division South-East. 
Basketball - 
Keysborough is also represented in basketball at a state level by the Keysborough Cougars.  The Cougars have a number of junior sides and a team in the Big V. 
Golf - 
Golfers play at the course of the Keysborough Golf Club on Hutton Road, or at the course of the Southern Golf Club on Lower Dandenong Road in neighbouring Braeside.
Other -
Keysborough is also the home of the Victorian Dodgeball Association, whose annual event "Dodge Day Afternoon" is held at Springers Leisure Centre, just off Cheltenham Road, each October.
Horse riding lessons and horse agistment (paddocks for hire) are available in Keysborough and the nearby suburb of Bangholme.

See also
 City of Springvale – Keysborough was previously within this former local government area.

References

Suburbs of Melbourne
Suburbs of the City of Greater Dandenong